In mathematical analysis, asymptotic analysis, also known as asymptotics, is a method of describing limiting behavior.

As an illustration, suppose that we are interested in the properties of a function  as  becomes very large.

An example of an important asymptotic result is the prime number theorem. Then the theorem states that

Asymptotic analysis is commonly used in computer science as part of the analysis of algorithms and is often expressed there in terms of big O notation.

Definition 

if and only if 

The symbol  is the tilde.

The same notation is also used for other ways of passing to a limit: e.g. The way of passing to the limit is often not stated explicitly, if it is clear from the context.

Although the above definition is common in the literature, it is problematic if  is zero infinitely often as  goes to the limiting value. For that reason, some authors use an alternative definition. The alternative definition, in little-o notation, is that  if and only if

This definition is equivalent to the prior definition if  is not zero in some neighbourhood of the limiting value.

Properties 

 , for every real 
  if 
 
 

Such properties allow asymptotically-equivalent functions to be freely exchanged in many algebraic expressions.

Examples of asymptotic formulas
 Factorial  —this is Stirling's approximation
 Partition function  For a positive integer n, the partition function, p(n), gives the number of ways of writing the integer n as a sum of positive integers, where the order of addends is not considered. 
 Airy function  The Airy function, Ai(x), is a solution of the differential equation ; it has many applications in physics. 
 Hankel functions

Asymptotic expansion

In view of the definition of the  symbol, the last equation means  in the little o notation, i.e.,  is much smaller than 

The relation  takes its full meaning if  for all k, which means the  form an asymptotic scale.

In the present situation, this relation  actually follows from combining steps k and k−1; by subtracting  from  one gets  i.e. 

In case the asymptotic expansion does not converge, for any particular value of the argument there will be a particular partial sum which provides the best approximation and adding additional terms will decrease the accuracy. This optimal partial sum will usually have more terms as the argument approaches the limit value.

Examples of asymptotic expansions

 Gamma function 
 Exponential integral 
 Error function  where  is the double factorial.

Worked example

Asymptotic expansions often occur when an ordinary series is used in a formal expression that forces the taking of values outside of its domain of convergence. For example, we might start with the ordinary series

The integral on the left hand side can be expressed in terms of the exponential integral. The integral on the right hand side, after the substitution , may be recognized as the gamma function. Evaluating both, one obtains the asymptotic expansion

Here, the right hand side is clearly not convergent for any non-zero value of t. Substituting  and noting that  results in the asymptotic expansion given earlier in this article.

Asymptotic distribution 

In mathematical statistics, an asymptotic distribution is a hypothetical distribution that is in a sense the "limiting" distribution of a sequence of distributions. An asymptotic distribution allows  to range without bound, that is,  is infinite.

A special case of an asymptotic distribution is when the late entries go to zero—that is, the  go to 0 as  goes to infinity. Some instances of "asymptotic distribution" refer only to this special case.

This is based on the notion of an asymptotic function which cleanly approaches a constant value (the asymptote) as the independent variable goes to infinity; "clean" in this sense meaning that for any desired closeness epsilon there is some value of the independent variable after which the function never differs from the constant by more than epsilon.

An asymptote is a straight line that a curve approaches but never meets or crosses. Informally, one may speak of the curve meeting the asymptote "at infinity" although this is not a precise definition. In the equation  y becomes arbitrarily small in magnitude as x increases.

Applications
Asymptotic analysis is used in several mathematical sciences. In statistics, asymptotic theory provides limiting approximations of the probability distribution of sample statistics, such as the likelihood ratio statistic and the expected value of the deviance. Asymptotic theory does not provide a method of evaluating the finite-sample distributions of sample statistics, however. Non-asymptotic bounds are provided by methods of approximation theory.

Examples of applications are the following.
 In applied mathematics, asymptotic analysis is used to build numerical methods to approximate equation solutions.
 In mathematical statistics and probability theory, asymptotics are used in analysis of long-run or large-sample behaviour of random variables and estimators.
 In computer science in the analysis of algorithms, considering the performance of algorithms.
 The behavior of physical systems, an example being statistical mechanics.
 In accident analysis when identifying the causation of crash through count modeling with large number of crash counts in a given time and space.

Asymptotic analysis is a key tool for exploring the ordinary and partial differential equations which arise in the mathematical modelling of real-world phenomena. An illustrative example is the derivation of the boundary layer equations from the full Navier-Stokes equations governing fluid flow. In many cases, the asymptotic expansion is in power of a small parameter, : in the boundary layer case, this is the nondimensional ratio of the boundary layer thickness to a typical length scale of the problem. Indeed, applications of asymptotic analysis in mathematical modelling often center around a nondimensional parameter which has been shown, or assumed, to be small through a consideration of the scales of the problem at hand.

Asymptotic expansions typically arise in the approximation of certain integrals (Laplace's method, saddle-point method, method of steepest descent) or in the approximation of probability distributions (Edgeworth series). The Feynman graphs in quantum field theory are another example of asymptotic expansions which often do not converge.

See also

Asymptote
Asymptotic computational complexity
Asymptotic density (in number theory)
Asymptotic theory (statistics)
Asymptotology
Big O notation
Leading-order term
Method of dominant balance (for ODEs)
Method of matched asymptotic expansions
Watson's lemma

Notes

References

External links
Asymptotic Analysis  —home page of the journal, which is published by IOS Press
 A paper on time series analysis using asymptotic distribution

 
Mathematical series